The United Cannery, Agricultural, Packing, and Allied Workers of America (UCAPAWA) was a labor union formed in 1937 and incorporated large numbers of Mexican, black, Asian, and Anglo food processing workers under its banner. The founders envisioned a national decentralized labor organization with power flowing from the bottom up. Although it was short-lived, the UCAPAWA influenced the lives of many workers and had a major impact for both women and minority workers in the union.

History
The United Cannery, Agricultural, Packing Allied Workers of America (or UCAPAWA) was an organization formed after the American Federation of Labor (AFL) ignored several delegate members plea to have better working conditions for farm and food processing workers.   At its head stood an intense and energetic organizer named Donald Henderson who was a young economics instructor at Columbia University and a member of the Communist party. Henderson, who was also one of the founders of the People’s Congress, noted the importance this union placed on popularizing the conditions of black and Mexican American workers and organizing them as a way to improve their social and economic situation. Henderson declared that the “International Office was sufficiently concerned with the conditions facing . . . the Negro people and the Mexican and Spanish American peoples.” Henderson observed that both minority groups were deprived of civil rights, exploited to the point of starvation, kept in decayed housing, denied educational opportunities, and in Henderson’s view, “blocked from their own cultural development.” Henderson eventually, as President of the union, established it as the agricultural arm of Congress of Industrial Organizations (CIO) in 1937 after having been abandoned by the AFL.

Unable to persuade the AFL to charter an international union of agricultural workers and increasingly drawn to the Congress of Industrial Organizations (CIO) industrial union structure, Henderson and representatives from locals throughout the country met in Denver in July 1937 to form UCAPAWA, which promptly received a charter from the CIO. Part of the reason behind its founding was to address the concerns of agricultural laborers and their counterparts in packing and canning during the Great Depression.

The UCAPAWA represented multi-cultural workers from Mexicans in sugar beet to black sharecroppers in Arkansas and Missouri. They were also very involved in Asian-American workers such as Filipino, Chinese and Japanese cannery workers in Washington. UCAPAWA was particularly strong among Mexican and Mexican American workers. In 1940, the San Francisco News called UCAPAWA the "fastest growing agricultural union in California", and attributed its success to its appeal to Mexican and Mexican American workers. The union was also supported by such outside organizations as the John Steinbeck Committee to Aid Agricultural Organization, the J. Lubin Society, the Spanish-speaking Peoples Congress, and on occasion, local clergy.

A commitment to trade union democracy, shared by both national leaders and regular members provided the underlying philosophy for union endeavors.   Some leaders of the UCAPAWA saw themselves as participants of a radical culture and political projects. When the UCAPAWA entered an affiliation the Arkansas-based Southern Tenant Farmers Union (STFU) there was controversy regarding political associations. Infighting between Communist party leaders and the local Socialists who served as the organization’s principal administrators, as well as personality and ideological conflicts marred the alliance from the start.   According to the  both the STFU and UCAPAWA differed over a fundamental issue: Whether agricultural workers could best be served by a protest organization or a trade union. STFU thought that sharecroppers and tenant farmers could not be organized because they were uneducated and too poor.

The UCAPAWA disagreed and argued that agricultural workers could be taught the rudimentary procedures for running the locals and that union members had to support their own organization.    Another difference between the STFU and UCAPAWA was that the STFU wanted a centralized government while the UCAPAWA believed in a more decentralized system. After the STFU departed, the UCAPAWA’s constitution guaranteed local autonomy and provided for local control of at least half of all dues collected. The STFU dispute was a turning point for UCAPAWA. Agricultural unions did not have collective bargaining rights and often faced local hostility. As a result, UCAPAWA shifted its focus from the fields to processing plants.

The UCAPAWA distanced themselves further from conventional unions and organizations by representing working classes generally ignored by traditional craft affiliates. Union officers deliberately enlisted black, Mexican, Asian and female labor organizers in order to launch campaigns aimed at minorities and women.  UCAPAWA was spreading their wings from fields to fisheries, canneries, processing plants and even tobacco manufacturing workers. The UCAPAWA was fast becoming one of the more influential unions in America and when the 1939 Madera Cotton Strike happened the UCAPAWA proved they were a force to be reckoned with. Besides UCAPAWA proving themselves a strong union they were also beginning to acquire a reputation as a communist party (CP).

While some truly believe the demise of the UCAPAWA was caused by the involvement with the Radical Party, many members of UCAPAWA believed themselves to be more liberal than anything. The argument of whether the union leaders were supporters of Communism set off an argument between many local leaders. Vicki L. Ruiz makes a very important statement in her book  She writes that “UCAPAWA certainly had a leftist stance, though the nature and extent of its leftist ideology will continue to be debated.” Despite their roots or political stance, the UCAPAWA had shown that it could organize the nation’s most vulnerable workers. It also showed that women and minority groups were capable of playing an important role in the labor movement.

Role of women

One of the most prominent roles that UCAPAWA played was in the workplace for women, especially Mexican women. Forming half of UCAPAWA’s total membership, women were not silent partners. On the contrary, they performed various services ranging from negotiating contracts to calling numbers at bingo. Women organizing women became a union hallmark. Women enthusiastically joined a labor organization that actively encouraged their involvement and offered them genuine opportunities for leadership. UCAPAWA food and tobacco locals proved successful in securing higher wages and benefits that were particularly important to women. In fact, one of the most important positions, Vice President, was filled by Dorothy Ray Healey.  Left-wing labor activists like Healey were successful because they embraced the Popular Front viewpoint and represented themselves as links to ethnic communities and as advocates of racial equality. Healey was assisted by a core group of college students and Young Communist League members who worked in the plant during the summer and were actively involved in organizing.

In the beginning, UCAPAWA had the financial support of the CIO, but there were hard times ahead for the newly-formed organization. UCAPAWA was one of the few labor unions that allowed women to hold positions of authority. There, they pushed for such benefits as maternity leave and equal pay, and they were on the forefront in the struggle for women's equality. By 1937, Henderson could report a membership of over 120,000 workers in more than 300 locals.

By 1946, nearly nine of ten cannery contracts set the minimum wage at sixty-five cents an hour. Two thirds contained "equal pay for equal work" clauses. More importantly, three fourths provided leave of absence for pregnancy or other reasons without losing seniority. Four fifths of the agreements also included benefits as paid vacations as well as bonuses for night or swing shift work. More than half had stipulations concerning paid holidays, union input in setting piece rates, and overtime pay after forty hours per week.

During the 1938 pecan-sheller's strike led by Emma Tenayuca in San Antonio, UCAPAWA president Henderson dispatched organizer Luisa Moreno to turn the local, El Nogal, into an efficient bargaining organization.  Tenayuca had by then already established the Texas Pecan Shelling Workers Union, UCAPAWA Local 172. Their primary grievances put forth against the Seligmann Company were a 15% pay cut, deploring plant conditions, and unpaid homework. The strike, which also became violent when strikers were teargassed, ended with the recognition of the UCAPAWA local and a minimum wage for workers. Local San Antonio Police responded by attacking Tenyuaca and the UCAPAWA local leadership, arresting them and charging them with "Communist Agitation."

In 1939, UCAPAWA Vice-President Dorothy Ray Healey played an important role in unionizing workers at California Sanitary Canning Company (Cal San) in Los Angeles, who struck in August of the same year. Union members picketed the cannery, grocery stores that sold Cal San goods, and the houses of the Shapiro brothers, the plant's owners. Faced with children holding signs bearing slogans such as "I'm underfed because Mama is underpaid," the Shapiro brothers met with negotiators and soon reached a settlement. The Cal San local became UCAPAWA's second largest, and the union's ranks grew to include the workers at several California canneries.

Strikes

One of the early strikes of UCAPAWA was the 1939 Madera Cotton Strike, which, despite provoking a violent reaction from the Associated Farmers, succeeded in winning a minimum wage for union members. It also served as an example of inter-ethnic solidarity, with African American, Mexican American, and White American workers all participating in the strike.

In Seattle, Washington, UCAPAWA represented Filipino cannery workers from 1937 to 1947. That was a great example of UCAPAWA supporting a minority group that was usually overlooked by bigger unions.

In Texas, UCAPAWA was instrumental in unionizing and uniting workers from feed, flour, and cotton mills. At a 1938 wildcat strike of shrimp-processing plant workers, a UCAPAWA organizer was murdered on the picket line.

At post-strike meetings, Dorothy Healey outlined election procedures and general union bylaws. The cannery workers who had led the strike were elected to every major post. UCAPAWA organizers Luke Hinman and Ted Rasmussen, who began an organizing drive at the California Walnut Growers' Association plant, replaced Healey.

Demise

In the South, the Southern Tenant Farmers Union (STFU), which Communist UCAPAWA President Donald Henderson regarded as "a utopian agrarian movement," became affiliated with the union. A power struggle between the groups erupted soon after the affiliation and culminated with a 1939 protest against the eviction of sharecroppers in Missouri, which was not supported by the national organization. As a result, the STFU left the union.
Anticommunism was not the sole thread in the fabric of responses to UCAPAWA's organization although there were Communists in UCAPAWA. However, UCAPAWA was not a "communist union." In 1944, UCAPAWA became the Food, Tobacco, Agricultural, and Allied Workers (FTA). In 1946, the Los Angeles local "collapsed under the weight of Red Scare witchhunts." By 1950, the FTA had only 1,000 workers as members, and it was folded into the Distributive and Processing Workers of America.

References

Congress of Industrial Organizations
Mexican-American history
Food processing trade unions
Trade unions established in 1937
Trade unions disestablished in 1944
United Food and Commercial Workers